Azirines are three-membered heterocyclic unsaturated (i.e. they contain a double bond) compounds containing a nitrogen atom and related to the saturated analogue aziridine. They are highly reactive yet have been reported in a few natural products such as Dysidazirine. There are two isomers of azirine: 1H-Azirines with a carbon-carbon double bond are not stable and rearrange to the tautomeric 2H-azirine, a compound with a carbon-nitrogen double bond. 2H-Azirines can be considered strained imines and are isolable.

Preparation

2H-Azirine is most often obtained by the thermolysis of vinyl azides. During this reaction, a nitrene is formed as an intermediate. Alternatively, they can be obtained by oxidation of the corresponding aziridine.
Azirine can be generated during photolysis of isoxazole. Due to the weak N-O bond, the isoxazole ring tends to collapse under UV irradiation, rearranging to azirine.

Reactions 
Photolysis of azirines (under 300 nm) is a very efficient way to generate nitrile ylides. These nitrile ylides are dipolar compounds and can be trapped by a variety of dipolarophiles to yield heterocyclic compounds, e.g. pyrrolines.

The strained ring system also undergoes reactions that favor ring opening and can act as a nucleophile or an electrophile.

An azirine is an intermediate in the Neber rearrangement.

See also
 Dysidazirine, one of only a few naturally-occurring azirines

References

Nitrogen heterocycles
Imines
Three-membered rings